John Robert Bale (born May 22, 1974) is a former Major League Baseball left-handed pitcher. Bale and his wife, Genevieve, reside in Niceville, Florida, with their daughters, Madison and Olivia, and their son, Zachary. Genevieve's brother is NHL player Vincent LeCavalier.

Bale, a graduate of Crestview High School, Crestview, Florida, was an All-State selection in baseball his senior season after going 11–2 with a 0.38 ERA. He is an alumnus of The University of Southern Mississippi, where he went 9–8 with a 4.01 ERA his junior year. He was selected by the St. Louis Cardinals in the 12th round of the  MLB Draft, but did not sign.

Career

Toronto Blue Jays
After being drafted by the Toronto Blue Jays in the 5th round of the 1996 Major League Baseball Draft, Bale made his Major League debut with the Blue Jays on September 30, .

Baltimore Orioles
On December 11, Bale was traded from the Blue Jays to the Baltimore Orioles for outfielder Jayson Werth.

In 2001, his only season with the Orioles, he had a 1–0 record and a 3.04 earned run average (ERA) in fourteen relief appearances. He was dealt to the New York Mets for Gary Matthews, Jr. on April 3, 2002. He never appeared in a game for the Mets.

Cincinnati Reds
On May 8, Bale signed as a free agent with the Cincinnati Reds, with whom he appeared in 10 games.

Hiroshima Toyo Carp

Kansas City Royals
On December 8, it was announced that Bale would return to Major League Baseball, after signing a two-year contract with the Kansas City Royals.

He had a 1–1 record with a 4.05 earned run average, surrendering 45 hits in 40 innings. He began the  season in the Royals' starting rotation after a strong spring training. "Bale earned it," Royals manager Trey Hillman said to the Kansas City Star on March 25. "Johnny has been outstanding all through spring training. He's been hit in spots but, pretty much, from day one he's commanded three pitches." In one of the more bizarre instances in recent Royals history, Bale, who was already on the disabled list due to a shoulder injury, broke his left (pitching) hand in May 2010 when he punched a hotel door in what Bale called "a moment of frustration."

Bale recorded his first career save on June 24, 2010, pitching a perfect 11th inning against the Houston Astros.

Bale was released by the Royals on December 10, 2009.
On September 14, 2012, he will be inducted into the Crestview High School sports hall of fame.

Second stint with the Carp
On February 19, 2010, Bale signed a contract with the Hiroshima Toyo Carp in Japan's Central League.

Detroit Tigers
On December 3, 2010, Bale signed a minor league contract with the Detroit Tigers.

References

External links
, or Retrosheet
Pelota Binaria (Venezuelan Winter League)

1974 births
Living people
American expatriate baseball players in Canada
American expatriate baseball players in Japan
Baltimore Orioles players
Baseball players from Maryland
Camden Riversharks players
Cardenales de Lara players
American expatriate baseball players in Venezuela
Cincinnati Reds players
Dunedin Blue Jays players
Gulf Coast Orioles players
Hagerstown Suns players
Hiroshima Toyo Carp players
Jefferson Davis Warhawks baseball players
Kansas City Royals players
Knoxville Smokies players
Louisville Bats players
Major League Baseball pitchers
Nippon Professional Baseball pitchers
Norfolk Tides players
Northwest Arkansas Naturals players
Omaha Royals players
People from Cheverly, Maryland
People from Niceville, Florida
Rochester Red Wings players
Southern Miss Golden Eagles baseball players
Sportspeople from the Washington metropolitan area
St. Catharines Stompers players
Syracuse SkyChiefs players
Toronto Blue Jays players
Wichita Wranglers players